This is a list of mayors of Cotati, California.

The City of Cotati has had a mayor almost continuously since its incorporation on July 16, 1963. Each year, the Cotati City Council chooses one of its members to serve as mayor.  Mayors usually serve for one year at a time, but many mayors have served multiple terms.

Mayoral powers and duties
The mayor presides over meetings of the City Council and also chairs Cotati's redevelopment agency (CMC 2.40.050) and disaster council (CMC 2.24.030).

In addition, the mayor may:
 call special meetings of the council (Cotati Municipal Code 2.04.030),
 excuse the city manager from attending council meetings (CMC 2.12.130),
 appoint people to the Planning Commission (CMC 2.16.010), the Community and Environment Commission (CMC 2.20.030), the Police Auxiliary Commission (CMC 2.22.030), and
 administer oaths to witnesses at council meetings (CMC 2.32.050).

Chronological list

References

San Francisco Bay Area politicians
Cotati, California
cotati